The Coventry bombing of 25 August 1939 was carried out by the Irish Republican Army (IRA) as a part of its S-Plan campaign of bombing English cities. A bomb was left in Coventry city centre in the West Midlands, which resulted in 5 deaths and 70 injuries. Two IRA members were convicted of the bombing and hanged, while a third, who acknowledged planting the bomb, escaped. Several accused were acquitted. It was the first bombing of the campaign in which civilians were killed. Republican sources later stated that civilians were not the intended target(s).

Attack
On 25 August 1939 at around 13:40, an Irish Republican Army member left a bomb in the basket of a bicycle, which was left against a kerb outside Astley's shop in the busy Broadgate area of Coventry. At 14:32 the  bomb exploded killing five people and injuring seventy.

The bicycle is said to have been bought by the leader of the group James McCormick, who used the alias James Richards, in Halfords, with the bomb stored at his lodgings in 25 Clara Street. The potassium chlorate to be used in the bomb was then brought by train to Coventry by IRA transport officer, Peter Barnes, who returned to London the same day.

The bombing took place nine days before the outbreak of World War II. While the official objective of the S-Plan was to force a British withdrawal from Northern Ireland, it has been said that the bombing was intended "to aid the German cause" or as a "public display" of the IRA's strength to Germany.

The five who died were: Elsie Ansell, 21; John Arnott, 15; Rex Gentle, 30; James Clay, 82; Gwilym Rowlands, 50. Ansell, who was closest to the blast, was only identifiable by her engagement ring.

Arrest and trial
The chief suspect was the leader of the Coventry IRA Dominic Adams who was the uncle of the former President of Sinn Féin, Gerry Adams. Prior to the explosion Adams fled Coventry via train.

Barnes was arrested first and a raid at his lodgings in Westbourne Terrace, London, uncovered damning evidence in regards to the Coventry bombing. He was also linked to three "bicycle bomb" plots in London. On 28 August, the Coventry City Police along with Special Branch raided the lodgings at 25 Clara Street, where equipment for making bombs was discovered and the five occupants arrested. Initially released pending deportation, those arrested at Clara Street where re-arrested on 2 September. On 27 September, Barnes and McCormick, along with Joseph and Mary Hewitt, and Brigid O'Hara, were charged with the murder of Elsie Ansell, one of the bomb victims. Joby O'Sullivan who had planted the bomb said he wasn't caught because the authorities were expecting him to get a ferry at Holyhead back to Ireland. Instead he got a train to London and stayed there "until everything died down." The trial took place at Warwick Assizes, Birmingham. Both Hewitts and O'Hara were acquitted. Barnes and McCormick, however, were sentenced to death for their part in the bombing. Both Barnes and McCormick stated during his trial that their orders were not to endanger life. As the Judge was about to deliver sentence, McCormick stated "As a soldier of the Irish Republican Army I am not afraid to die, as I am doing it for a just cause."

Prior to the executions, the Irish Taoiseach, Éamon de Valera, requested several times for the sentences to be commuted. The requests were refused; Barnes and McCormick were hanged at Winson Green Prison on 7 February 1940. As they were being led to the execution, Barnes continued to protest his innocence, whereas McCormick remained defiant shouting "republican propaganda". They were buried in unmarked graves. Their remains were flown to Dublin in 1969.

Aftermath
Many Irish people living in Coventry after the bombing found that the city's attitude had turned against them even though most of them had no IRA sympathies. Some Irish were told to find new lodgings, whilst strike action was threatened in factories unless they withdrew all 2,000 Irish labourers. An anti-IRA protest march was staged in Baginton by thousands of workers of Armstrong Whitworth. The chief constable of Coventry, Captain Hector, had to issue a denial saying that he was "perfectly good Sommerset man" and not Irish.

The outbreak of World War II on 3 September saw the bombing quickly leave the headlines. The Blitz of 1940 saw Coventry's centre, including the Broadgate area, totally destroyed, thus leading to the Coventry bombing to be described as the forgotten bombing.

The bomb was believed to have been meant for an electricity generating plant in the outskirts of Coventry. However, in 1969 whilst speaking to Irish journalist, Mike Burns, O'Sullivan is said to have planted the bomb and said that the intended target was a police station and that the bike kept get getting stuck in tram tracks meaning it had to be abandoned.

Both Barnes and McCormick were seen as martyrs back in Ireland, and their bodies were exhumed and repatriated.  A republican committee in London was set up to campaign for the return of their bodies to Ireland. Finally on 6 July 1969 their bodies were brought to Dublin City where upon arrival at Dublin Airport they were met with an IRA guard of honour and the relatives of the deceased. They were reburied in Mullingar, County Westmeath and their funeral was attended by 15,000 people. Republican Jimmy Steele gave the graveside oration.

In 2016 a graveside commemoration was held by the 'Spirit of Irish Freedom Society Westmeath' and the 'Tomas Allen Society'.

Memorial
In October 2015 a sandstone monument was unveiled in the grounds of Coventry Cathedral. A few dozen people gathered to witness it being unveiled, including relatives of four of the dead.

References

1939 in England
History of Coventry
Irish Republican Army (1922–1969)
Violence in England
1939 crimes in the United Kingdom
1939 murders in the United Kingdom